Raoul-Duval is a French surname. Notable people with the surname include:

 Edgar Raoul-Duval (1832–1887), French politician
 Maurice Raoul-Duval (1866–1916), French polo player who competed in the 1900 Summer Olympics
 Michael Raoul Duval, investment banker and lawyer in the USA who was Special Counsel to the President